Uzerche is a railway station in Uzerche, Nouvelle-Aquitaine, France. The station is located on the Orléans–Montauban railway line. The station is served by the Intercités (long distance) and TER (local) services.

Train services
The following services currently call at Uzerche:
intercity services (Intercités) Paris - Vierzon - Limoges - Toulouse
local service (TER Nouvelle-Aquitaine) Limoges - Uzerche - Brive-la-Gaillarde

References

Railway stations in Corrèze